Newk's Time is an album by Sonny Rollins. It was his third album for Blue Note Records, recorded in 1957 and released in 1959. The title of the album is a reference to Rollins' nickname "Newk", which is apparently based on his resemblance to Don Newcombe, a pitcher for the Brooklyn Dodgers. "Namely You" was taken from the Broadway show Li'l Abner. The release marked the beginning of Blue Note 4000 series: from this album on, the releases would be catalogued as "BLP 4..." (mono) and "BST 84..." (stereo).

Rollins' version of "Surrey with the Fringe on Top", from the musical Oklahoma!, takes the form of exchanges between the drums of Philly Joe Jones and the saxophonist.

Track listing 
 "Tune Up" (Miles Davis) – 5:44
 "Asiatic Raes" [also known as "Lotus Blossom"] (Kenny Dorham) – 5:57
 "Wonderful! Wonderful!" (Sherman Edwards-Ben Raleigh) – 5:59
 "The Surrey with the Fringe on Top" (Richard Rodgers-Oscar Hammerstein II) – 6:32
 "Blues for Philly Joe" (Sonny Rollins) – 6:44
 "Namely You" (Gene de Paul-Johnny Mercer) – 3:18

Personnel 
Sonny Rollins – tenor saxophone
Wynton Kelly – piano (1-3, 5-6)
Doug Watkins – bass (1-3, 5-6)
Philly Joe Jones – drums

Additional personnel
 Producer – Alfred Lion
 Recorded By – Rudy Van Gelder
 Photography [Cover Photo] – Francis Wolff

References 

Blue Note Records albums
1959 albums
Sonny Rollins albums
Albums produced by Alfred Lion
Albums recorded at Van Gelder Studio